The Chutes de la Kagera (Kagera Falls or Chutes de la Karera) are a spectacular series of waterfalls in southeastern Burundi. They are located to the south of Rutana.  The falls occupy over 142 hectares, being made up of six branches divided on three landings.

Description 
On a first level, is a main fall subdivided into two parallel branches of a length estimated at 80 m about which pours on a basin. This fall consists of several waterfalls of different sizes intersected with two platforms.  Another smaller waterfall is located roughly 50 m to the west of this main fall. Waters of these two falls converge on a second landing to form the third waterfall which pours on the valley.

World Heritage Status 
The site, along with the Nyakazu Fault, was added to the UNESCO World Heritage Tentative List on May 9, 2007 in the Mixed (Cultural & Natural) category.

References

Further reading 
 Fitzpatrick, M., Parkinson, T., & Ray, N. (2006) East Africa. Footscray, VIC: Lonely Planet.

Landforms of Burundi
Waterfalls of Africa